Diva X Machina 2 is a various artists compilation album released on July 14, 1998, by COP International. The compilation peaked at No. 2 on the CMJ RPM charts.

Reception

AllMusic gave Diva X Machina 2 a two-and-a-half out of five possible stars. A critic at Last Sigh Magazine called the collection "an important addition to have on hand for DJ's" and "an excellent addition to any CD collection as it portrays a wide variety of "industrial" sounds from the more mellow works of Ivoux to the hard hitting "slap in your face industrial" of Luxt." Alex Steininger of In Music We Trust called the album a "a powerful, seductive breath of life that will allow you to never look at the originals in the same light again." Sonic Boom said "once again COP International pulls together a collection of the female acts who pioneer the way we listen to electronic music" and "every track attempts to outperform its sisters are more often than not, succeeds."

Track listing

Personnel
Adapted from the Diva X Machina 2 liner notes.

 Kim Hansen (as Kim X) – compiling
 Louis "Magic" Zachert – mastering
 Nadine – cover art
 Christian Petke (as Count Zero) – compiling, design

Release history

References

External links 
 Diva X Machina 2 at Discogs (list of releases)

1998 compilation albums
COP International compilation albums